Yangju Nang clan is one of the Korean clans. Their Bon-gwan is in Yang Province, Jiangsu, China. According to research held in 2000, the number of Yangju Nang clan's member was 334. Their founder was  who was from Yang Province, Jiangsu and worked as the deputy minister of defense (兵部侍郎, Bingbu Shilang) in Ming dynasty during Chongzhen's reign. He was naturalized in Joseon between 1628 and 1644. According to 's record, he a descendant of surrender in Jurchen people.

See also 
 Korean clan names of foreign origin

References

External links 
 

Korean clan names of Chinese origin

Nang clans